Golden Phoenix Awards, China's equivalent to the Screen Actors Guild Awards, is a bi-annual accolade given by the China Film Performance Art Academy to recognize outstanding performances in film. In 1987, the first annual awards ceremony held in Guangzhou.

Because the Society Award is the only regular category that judges the actors' performances, there are multiple winners in the category. Honorary Awards are given to actors aged 60–70, while the Lifetime Achievement Award is given to actors who are over 80 years old. Since 2005, actors from Taiwan and Hong Kong have also eligible for awards.

The statuette is in a shape of phoenix, designed by artist Han Meilin.

Categories
Academy Award (表演学会奖/Society Award)
Special Jury Award (评委会特别奖)
New Actors Award (新人奖)
Honorary Award (特别荣誉奖)
Lifetime Achievement Award (终身成就奖)

References

External links
IMDB-Golden Phoenix Awards
Sina.com.cn (2005)

Chinese film awards
Awards established in 1987
1987 establishments in China
Biennial events
Recurring events established in 1987